Chad Michael Collins (born September 22, 1979) is an American actor. He is best known for his leading role in the Sniper film series.

Biography
He graduated from college in New York before moving to Los Angeles. He then started taking acting classes, when he is not acting, he works for a PR firm, JDS.

Filmography

Film

Television

Video games

References

External links

American male film actors
American male television actors
Living people
Actors from Albany, New York
1979 births